Ri Chol-myong (born 18 February 1988) is a North Korean international football player. He plays for Pyongyang City in the DPR Korea League.

He has played on 44 occasions for the North Korean national team, scoring a goal in the 2010 AFC Challenge Cup against Kyrgyzstan. He has been called up to their 23-man squad for the 2010 FIFA World Cup.

Ri Chol-myong was a part of the squad in the 2010 Asian Games. Korea DRR lost 8–9 in a penalty shoot-out in the hands of UAE in the quarter-finals. Korea DPR lost because of the penalty Ri missed.

International goals

References

External links

Ri Chol-Myong career stats at Soccerbase
Ri Chol-Myong at DPRKFootball

1988 births
Living people
Sportspeople from Pyongyang
North Korean footballers
Association football midfielders
North Korea international footballers
Amnokgang Sports Club players
2010 FIFA World Cup players
Footballers at the 2006 Asian Games
Footballers at the 2010 Asian Games
Asian Games competitors for North Korea